Clathromangelia coffea is a species of sea snail, a marine gastropod mollusk in the family Raphitomidae.

Description
The shell grows to a length of 22 mm.

Distribution
This species occurs in the Pacific Ocean off the Philippines and Japan.

References

 Kuroda, T.; Habe, T.; Oyama, K. (1971). The Sea Shells of Sagami Bay. Maruzen Co., Tokyo. xix, 1–741 (Japanese text), 1–489 (English text), 1–51 (Index), pls 1–121

External links
 
  Bouchet P., Kantor Yu.I., Sysoev A. & Puillandre N. (2011) A new operational classification of the Conoidea. Journal of Molluscan Studies 77: 273–308

coffea